Barry Ditchburn is a British former professional Grand Prix motorcycle road racer. His best year was in 1977 when he finished in 11th place in the 250cc world championship as a teammate to Kork Ballington and Mick Grant on the Kawasaki factory racing team.

Grand Prix motorcycle racing results

(key) (Races in bold indicate pole position; races in italics indicate fastest lap)

References

External links
 Barry Ditchburn profile at IOMTT.com

Living people
British motorcycle racers
250cc World Championship riders
Isle of Man TT riders
Year of birth missing (living people)